The Raneh Falls is a natural waterfall on the Ken River, located in Khajuraho in the Indian state of Madhya Pradesh.

The falls

There is a series of waterfalls in the canyon. The larger and smaller falls run all through the year. Other seasonal falls appear during monsoons.

Location
The Ken Gharial Sanctuary is located at the confluence of the Ken and Khudar rivers further down from Reneh Falls. The Ken river here runs through a narrow gorge of igneous rocks rich in Granite and Dolomite. The Pandav Falls in Panna National Park is also located nearby.

References

External links 
 
raneh falls

Chhatarpur district
Waterfalls of Madhya Pradesh